Red Hill is an unincorporated community in Lawrence County, Indiana, in the United States.

The community of Red Hill took its name from a prominent local hill.

References

Unincorporated communities in Lawrence County, Indiana
Unincorporated communities in Indiana